The  was an electric multiple unit (EMU) commuter train type operated by the private railway operator Sagami Railway (Sotetsu) in Japan.

History
First introduced in December 1955, the trains were rebuilt from 1972 with new lightweight aluminium bodies and air-conditioning.
The last train in operation was withdrawn on 11 February 2009.

References

Electric multiple units of Japan
5000 series
Train-related introductions in 1955
1955 in rail transport